
Gmina Tuszyn is an urban-rural gmina (administrative district) in Łódź East County, Łódź Voivodeship, in central Poland.

Villages
Apart from the town of Tuszyn, Gmina Tuszyn contains the villages and settlements of Bądzyń, Dylew, Garbów, Garbówek, Głuchów, Gołygów, Górki Duże, Górki Małe, Jutroszew, Kruszów, Mąkoszyn, Modlica, Rydzynki, Syski, Szczukwin, Tuszynek Majoracki, Wodzin Majoracki, Wodzin Prywatny, Wodzinek, Wola Kazubowa, Żeromin and Zofiówka.

Neighbouring gminas
Gmina Tuszyn is bordered by the gminas of Brójce, Czarnocin, Dłutów, Grabica, Moszczenica, Pabianice and Rzgów.

References
Polish official population figures 2006

Tuszyn
Łódź East County